{{DISPLAYTITLE:C10H8O3S}}
The molecular formula C10H8O3S (molar mass: 208.234 g/mol, exact mass: 208.0194 u) may refer to:

 Naphthalene-1-sulfonic acid
 Naphthalene-2-sulfonic acid
 Jedi2